The Museum of Chincoteague Island, located at 7125 Maddox Boulevard, Chincoteague, Virginia, United States, celebrates the people, culture and heritage of Chincoteague Island.

Exhibits
Exhibits cover the entire history of the island from prehistoric times to today and include the first-order Fresnel lens from the nearby Assateague Light, as well as the 6th order Fresnel lens from the Fort Washington Light on the Potomac River. The museum is also the home of the taxidermied bodies of iconic Chincoteague ponies Misty and Stormy, famously portrayed in the award-winning series of books by Marguerite Henry and the children's classic film, "Misty of Chincoteague". Other exhibits focus on the island's oyster industry, its maritime history, the wild ponies of neighboring Assateague Island, and the historic role of islanders as watermen, light keepers and shipwreck rescuers.

References

External links
Chincoteague Museum official website

1972 establishments in Virginia
Museums established in 1972
Maritime museums in Virginia
Museums in Accomack County, Virginia
Chincoteague, Virginia